Princess Caroline of Monaco (Caroline Louise Marguerite; born 23 January 1957) is, by her marriage to Prince Ernst August, the Princess of Hanover. As the eldest child of Rainier III, Prince of Monaco, and Grace Kelly, she is the elder sister of Albert II, Prince of Monaco, and Princess Stéphanie.

She was Hereditary Princess of Monaco and heir presumptive to the Monegasque throne from her birth in 1957 until her brother Albert was born the following year, and again from Albert's accession in 2005 until the birth of his twins, her niece Gabriella and nephew Jacques, in 2014.

Family and early life
Caroline was born on 23 January 1957 in the Prince's Palace, Monaco. She is the eldest child of Rainier III, Prince of Monaco, and his wife, former American actress Grace Kelly. Christened Caroline Louise Marguerite, she belongs to the House of Grimaldi. She was the heiress presumptive from her birth to 14 March 1958, when her brother Prince Albert was born. On 1 February 1965, her younger sister Princess Stéphanie was born. Caroline is a legitimate patrilineal descendant of the Dukes of Polignac, and as such belongs to the historical French nobility. Through her mother, she is of Irish and German descent.

In an interview for People in April 1982, shortly before her death, Grace described Caroline and Stéphanie as "warm, bright, amusing, intelligent and capable girls. They're very much in tune with their era. Besides being good students, they are good athletes – excellent skiers and swimmers. Both can cook and sew and play the piano and ride a horse. But, above all, my children are good sports, conscious of their position and considerate of others. They are sympathetic to the problems and concerns in the world today."

As a child, Caroline spent time at the home of her maternal grandparents, John B. Kelly, Sr. and Margaret Kelly (née, Majer), in Philadelphia. In addition to visiting her mother's family in the United States, she spent the summer of 1971 at Camp Oneka in the Poconos at the age of 14. While there, unbeknownst to her parents, Caroline was protected by the United States Secret Service.

Princess Grace died on 14 September 1982, the day after suffering a stroke while driving herself and Princess Stéphanie home to Monaco from a visit to France; resulting in an accident in which both were injured.

Education
The princess received her French baccalauréat in 1974 with honours. She was also educated at St Mary's School Ascot. After a semester at Sciences Po, Caroline continued her studies at the Sorbonne University, where she received a diploma in philosophy and minors in psychology and biology. She is fluent in French, English, Spanish, German and Italian.

Activities

In 1979, Princess Caroline was appointed by her parents as the president of the Monégasque Committee for the International Year of the Child. Two years later, in 1981, Caroline founded Jeune J'écoute association. The association set up a 'youth hotline' where young people can talk about their problems on the telephone with qualified people trained in dealing problems young people faced. Other philanthropic organizations Caroline has been involved with include the World Association of Children's Friends (AMADE Mondiale), the Princess Grace Foundation, the Prince Pierre Foundation, the Peter Le Marchant Trust and UNICEF. Her other patronages include the International School of Paris, Les Ballets de Monte Carlo, which she also founded, the Monte-Carlo Philharmonic Orchestra, the Association des Guides et Scouts de Monaco, the Monte Carlo Garden Club and The Spring Arts Festival. In 1992, she was appointed the president of the International Contemporary Art Prize.

Following her mother's death in 1982, Caroline served as de facto first lady of Monaco until her brother married Charlene Wittstock in 2011. She regularly attends important social events in Monaco related to the Monégasque Princely Family, such as the National Day celebrations, the annual Rose Ball, the Red Cross Ball and the Formula One competition Monaco Grand Prix.
Due to her commitment to philanthropy and arts, Caroline was named a UNESCO Goodwill Ambassador on 2 December 2003. The UNICEF honoured her with Children's Champion Award on 20 May 2006. The next year, she travelled to the Republic of South Africa to meet its former president Nelson Mandela. In December 2011, the World Association of Children's Friends honoured her for "tireless endeavours in continuing the organisation's legacy". Her personal friend and the Chanel head designer Karl Lagerfeld presented her the award. Caroline had also previously been given the Grand Cross of the Order of St. Charles, and had been appointed as the Commander of the Order of Cultural Merit.

Personal and media life

Caroline's personal interests include horseback riding, swimming and skiing. Since her youth, she has been considered an international fashion icon and as one of the best dressed women in the world. In November 2011, an exhibition honouring Princess Caroline was opened at the National Museum of Monaco.

Caroline was romantically linked to many famous men, including Henri Giscard d'Estaing, the son of former President of France Valéry Giscard d'Estaing; and French singer Philippe Lavil. Following her divorce from Philippe Junot, she was briefly engaged to Robertino Rossellini, the son of Roberto Rossellini and Ingrid Bergman. Between her second and third marriages, Caroline had a relationship with French actor Vincent Lindon.

First marriage
Princess Caroline's first husband was Philippe Junot (born 19 April 1940), a Parisian banker. They were married civilly in Monaco on 28 June 1978, and religiously on 29 June 1978. Their lavish wedding ceremony was attended by some 650 guests, including Hollywood stars Ava Gardner, Cary Grant and Frank Sinatra.

The couple divorced, childless, on 9 October 1980. In 1992, the  Catholic Church granted the princess an annulment.

Second marriage
Her second husband was Stefano Casiraghi (8 September 1960 – 3 October 1990), the sportsman heir to an Italian industrial fortune. They were married civilly in Monaco on 29 December 1983, and had three children:

 Andrea Albert Pierre Casiraghi (born on 8 June 1984 at Princess Grace Hospital Centre in Monaco). Married Tatiana Santo Domingo on 31 August 2013, at the Prince's Palace in Monaco-Ville. The couple have three children:
 Alexandre "Sasha" Andrea Stefano Casiraghi (born on 21 March 2013 at Portland Hospital in London; entered the line of succession to the Monegasque throne when his parents married).
 India Casiraghi (born on 12 April 2015 in London).
 Maximilian Rainier Casiraghi (born on 19 April 2018 in London).
 Charlotte Marie Pomeline Casiraghi (born on 3 August 1986 at Princess Grace Hospital Centre). Has a son with her former partner, the French actor and comedian Gad Elmaleh, and a second son with her husband, the French producer Dimitri Rassam:
 Raphaël Elmaleh (born on 17 December 2013 at Princess Grace Hospital Centre).
 Balthazar  Rassam (born on 23 October 2018 at Princess Grace Hospital Centre).
 Pierre Rainier Stefano Casiraghi (born on 5 September 1987 at Princess Grace Hospital Centre). He married Beatrice Borromeo in a civil ceremony on 25 July 2015, in the gardens of the Prince's Palace of Monaco. They have two children:
 Stefano Ercole Carlo Casiraghi (born on 28 February 2017 at Princess Grace Hospital Centre).
 Francesco Carlo Albert Casiraghi (born on 21 May 2018 at Princess Grace Hospital Centre).

The two younger children are named for their maternal great-grandparents, Princess Charlotte and Prince Pierre, while Andrea was named for a childhood friend of his father's. Stefano Casiraghi was killed in a speed-boating accident in 1990, aged 30 years.

Even though their parents had not married in the Church, as required under church law, their marriage was convalidated by Pope John Paul II in February 1993, eight months after their mother's marriage to Junot had been annulled in June 1992.

Third marriage

Caroline's third and current husband is Prince Ernst August of Hanover, Duke of Brunswick, head of the House of Hanover, which lost its throne in 1866. From 1913 to 1918, his family ruled the sovereign Duchy of Brunswick.

The couple married in Monaco on 23 January 1999. Ernst August had previously divorced his first wife Chantal Hochuli, with whom he had sons Prince Ernst August and Prince Christian, and who had been Caroline's friend.

The couple have one daughter together:
 Princess Alexandra Charlotte Ulrike Maryam Virginia of Hanover (born 20 July 1999 in Vöcklabruck, Austria)

Her husband's title as Duke of Brunswick is honorific since the ruling family of that state was removed by the Weimar Republic in 1918, along with all royal and noble German ruling families, which were still allowed to retain their titles. Neither she nor her husband has royal rank in Germany, but Monaco recognizes the Hanoverians' former German royal titles, attributing to the couple the style of Royal Highness. On 11 January 1999, shortly before Caroline and Ernst's wedding, his third cousin once removed (Queen Victoria was their common ancestor), Queen Elizabeth II of the United Kingdom, issued this Order in Council, "My Lords, I do hereby declare My Consent to a Contract of Matrimony between His Royal Highness Prince Ernst August Albert of Hanover, Duke of Brunswick-Luneburg and Her Serene Highness Princess Caroline Louise Marguerite of Monaco...". As a legitimate male-line descendant of George III, Ernst August was subject to the Royal Marriages Act 1772 (repealed in 2015). Prior to the repeal of the Act, the revised form of which limits those who must gain permission to the first six people in the line of British succession, marrying without the Queen's Royal Assent would have meant their marriage would be void in Britain, where Ernst August's family owned substantial property and he holds (dual) citizenship.

Likewise, the Monégasque court officially notified France of Caroline's contemplated marriage to Prince Ernst August and received assurance that there was no objection, in compliance with Article 2 of the 1918 Franco-Monégasque Treaty. Despite obtaining the official approval of the governments of France, Monaco and the United Kingdom, upon Caroline's marriage to Ernst August he forfeited his own place in Britain's order of succession. He is also subject to the Act of Settlement 1701, which imposes that consequence upon British dynasts who marry Roman Catholics.   The Succession to the Crown Act of 2013 however removed that consequence of marrying a Roman Catholic, and would place him back in the order of succession.

In 2009, it was reported that Caroline had separated from Ernst August and returned to live in Monaco.

Privacy cases 
Caroline has had a bad relationship with media and paparazzi since her youth, when she complained she "could not live the life of a normal student". On 24 June 2004, the Princess obtained a judgement from the European Court of Human Rights condemning Germany for non-respect of her right to private life under Article 8 of the European Convention on Human Rights.

Caroline invoked the judgment in combination with articles 1(1) and 2(1) of the Basic Law (human dignity and personal freedom, respectively) as well as § 22 of the German Art and Photography Copyright Act or KunstUrhG (no publication of personal images without permission) in a new domestic case, attempting to get the courts to prohibit publication of certain images of her in a private setting. The Supreme Court accepted her claim with regard to two images, but did not prohibit publication of a third, stating that the image accompanied an article about a subject of public interest, which allows publication without permission per § 23 of the KunstUrhG. Caroline appealed to the Federal Constitutional Court, which affirmed the Supreme Court's judgement. Unsatisfied with this result, Caroline filed a new complaint with the European Court of Human Rights. This time, the court found that the domestic courts had properly weighed the competing interests of Caroline's privacy and the press' right to freedom of expression, and thus found that there had been no violation of Article 8.

Writings
In April 1981, the Princess penned an essay, entitled "Home" and published in the International Herald Tribune's supplement. The byline was "Caroline de Grimaldi." In the essay, she wrote: "I long for the Mediterranean ... I feel in my bones that I belong in Monaco." The article was titled, "A Compulsive Need for Blue."

Succession issues
Princess Caroline was heiress presumptive to the crown of Monaco until the birth of her brother's legitimate children.

There is precedent for a Monégasque prince to adopt his own illegitimate child and thereby place that child at the head of the line of succession to the Monegasque throne, as was done for Caroline's grandmother, Princess Charlotte, Duchess of Valentinois. However, because of changes to the constitution of Monaco in 2002, this was no longer an option.

Albert's lack of legitimate children until the 2010s prompted Prince Rainier III to change the constitution so as to ensure there would be a successor to the throne, which strengthened the places of Caroline and her descendants in the line of succession. On 2 April 2002, Monaco passed Princely Law 1.249, which provides that if the Sovereign Prince assumes the throne and then dies without a legitimate direct heir, the throne will pass to his dynastic siblings and their descendants according to the rule of male-preference cognatic primogeniture. The law was then ratified by France, as required by a 1918 Franco-Monégasque Treaty, on 4 October 2005. Before this change, the crown of Monaco could pass only to a descendant of the last reigning prince, excluding such collateral relations as siblings, nephews, and nieces.

Titles, styles, honours and arms

Titles and styles
 23 January 1957 – 23 January 1999: Her Serene Highness Princess Caroline of Monaco
 23 January 1999 – present: Her Royal Highness The Princess of Hanover

Honours

National honours
 : Knight Grand Cross of the Order of Saint-Charles
 : 10 November 2005 Knight Commander of the Order of Cultural Merit
  House of Hanover: Knight of the Order of Saint George

Foreign honours
 : 3 July 2014 Commander of the Order of Agricultural Merit
 : 20 May 2014 Commander of the Order of Arts and Letters
 : Recipient of the 50th Birthday Medal of King Carl XVI Gustaf (30 April 1996)

International
  2 December 2003 UNESCO Goodwill Ambassador

Arms and monograms

Ancestry

See also
 House of Grimaldi
 Line of succession to the Monegasque throne
 Monegasque Princely Family

References

External links

 The Princess of Hanover at the Prince's Palace of Monaco

|-

|-

|-

|-

|-

1957 births
Commanders of the Order of Agricultural Merit
Commanders of the Order of Cultural Merit (Monaco)
Commandeurs of the Ordre des Arts et des Lettres
Duchesses of Brunswick-Lüneburg
Grand Crosses of the Order of Saint-Charles
Hanoverian princesses by marriage
Hereditary Princesses of Monaco
House of Grimaldi
House of Hanover
Kelly family
Living people
Monegasque people of American descent
Monegasque people of English descent
Monegasque people of German descent
Monegasque people of Irish descent
Monegasque people of Italian descent
Monegasque people of Mexican descent
Monegasque people of Scottish descent
Monegasque princesses
Monegasque Roman Catholics
People educated at St Mary's School, Ascot
Recipients of the Order of Agricultural Merit
Recipients of the Order of Saint Lazarus (statuted 1910)
Sciences Po alumni
UNESCO Goodwill Ambassadors
Daughters of monarchs